The 1872 United States presidential election in Georgia took place on November 5, 1872, as part of the 1872 United States presidential election. Voters chose 11 representatives, or electors to the Electoral College, who voted for president and vice president.

Georgia voted for the Liberal Republican candidate, Horace Greeley, over Republican candidate, Ulysses S. Grant. Greeley won Georgia by a margin of 9.94%. However, Greeley died prior to the Electoral College meeting, allowing Georgia's 11 electors to vote for the candidate of their choice: 6 voted for Greeley's running mate, B. Gratz Brown, and 2  for Charles Jenkins. 3 electors attempted to vote for the deceased Greeley, but their votes were rejected after a House of Representatives resolution.

Georgia was one of only two former Confederate states (along with Texas) that didn't vote Republican during the reconstruction elections of 1868, 1872, and 1876. During these elections, Southern Republicans were briefly empowered by newly registered black voters who would soon become disenfranchised again by anti-black laws known as black codes or Jim Crow laws in the late 1870s and 1880s. Despite failing to carry the state, Grant's 45.03% of the vote stood as the best performance by a Republican in Georgia until Barry Goldwater finally carried the state in 1964, 92 years later. 

This was the last time the Republican candidate carried Greene, Fannin, and Pickens county until 1884; the last time they carried Polk, Haralson, Thomas, and Clay counties until 1896; the last time they carried Gilmer and Dawson counties until 1904; the last time a Republican carried Fulton county, home to Atlanta, until 1928; the last time they carried Bryan, Charlton, Lowndes, Harris, Houston, Putnam, Pike, Clayton, and Fayette counties until 1964, and the last time they won Coweta, Meriwether, Butts, Newton, and Clarke counties until 1972, when Richard Nixon swept every county in Georgia.

Results

Footnotes

References

Georgia
1872
1872 Georgia (U.S. state) elections